Filth and Wisdom is a 2008 British comedy-drama film directed by Madonna, starring Eugene Hütz, Holly Weston, Vicky McClure and Richard E. Grant. It was filmed on location in London, England, from 14 to 29 May 2007. Locations included two actual strip clubs in Hammersmith and Swiss Cottage; both owned by the Secrets Clubs chain. Additional scenes were shot in July 2007.

The film premiered at the Berlin International Film Festival on 13 February 2008 which was attended by Madonna and cast members Hütz, Weston and McClure. It did not receive many positive reviews. On 17 October 2008 the film went into limited release, as well as being simultaneously released "On Demand" on most cable providers. It is the first motion picture production for Madonna's company, Semtex Films.

Plot
Described as a comedy/drama/musical/romance, the story revolves around a Ukrainian immigrant named A.K. (Eugene Hütz) who finances his dreams of rock glory by moonlighting as a cross-dressing dominatrix and his two female flatmates: Holly (Holly Weston), a ballet dancer who works as a stripper and pole-dancer at a local club and Juliette (Vicky McClure), a pharmacy assistant who dreams of going to Africa to help starving children.

The Gypsy punk band that appears in the film is portrayed by real-life Gypsy punk band, Gogol Bordello, who also contributed three songs to the film's soundtrack. The band's lead singer, Hütz, portrays the main character – a character with a philosophical attitude towards life. Madonna allowed additional dialogue written by Hütz himself to be included in the film.

Reception

Filth and Wisdom debuted in Berlin International Film Festival with mixed reviews. On the review aggregate website Rotten Tomatoes, it holds a 25% approval rating, based on 63 reviews with an average rating of 3.94/10, . The website's critics consensus reads: "Filth and Wisdom, while certainly ambitious, is mostly unconvincing and incoherent." The Times Online claimed, "Madonna has done herself proud" and The Telegraph described the film as "not an entirely unpromising first effort" but went on to say "Madonna would do well to hang on to her day job." Peter Bradshaw of The Guardian wrote, "Well, it had to happen. Madonna has been a terrible actor in many, many films and now – fiercely aspirational as ever – she has graduated to being a terrible director." Jonathan Romney of Screen International called the film "a good-humoured, averagely average vanity project" and "a cheap and cheerful comedy," adding that "Madonna simply cannot direct actors." The New Yorkers Anthony Lane panned the film, saying that "in technical terms, more professional productions than this are filmed and cut on iMovie, by ten-year-olds, a thousand times a day" and that "if the actors were paid according to their talents, they cannot have cost more than forty bucks."

Cast
Ade – DJ
Olegar Fedoro – A.K.'s Father
Eugene Hütz – A.K.
Holly Weston – Holly
Vicky McClure – Juliette
Richard E. Grant – Professor Flynn
Stephen Graham – Harry Beechman
Inder Manocha – Sardeep
Shobu Kapoor – Sardeep's wife
Elliot Levey – Businessman
Clare Wilkie – Chloe
Hannah Walters – Businessman's wife

References

External links

 
 
 
 
 Eugene Hütz Interview with Aaron Hillis at IFC News, October 2008

2008 films
British romantic comedy-drama films
British musical comedy-drama films
Films directed by Madonna
2000s musical comedy-drama films
2008 romantic comedy-drama films
Films shot in London
Films about Romani people
British romantic musical films
2000s romantic musical films
2008 directorial debut films
2008 comedy films
2008 drama films
BDSM in films
2000s English-language films
2000s British films
Films with screenplays by Madonna

sv:Filth and Wisdom